Sussex loop refer to a form of bronze objects found in South Downs/Weald area of England.

Description 
The loops are created from a thick rod of bronze that is bent in half to form a loop at one end. The rod is then shaped into a circle, with the ends of the rod curled and hooked back into the loop.

Origin 

The first four loops were found at Hollingbury Camp (a hill-fort on the northern edge of Brighton, in East Sussex) in 1825. The name of the object is derived from their shape and area of discovery. Five were found found in the Near Lewes hoard in 2011. The rest had been discovered within  Sussex. In May 2013, two loops were discovered outside Sussex.

Purpose 
The purpose of the loops remain unclear to archaeologists. Some suggest it may have been for adornments or for a ritual.

References 

Archaeological sites in Sussex